Coastal Road may refer to:

 Coastal Road (Mumbai), a grade separated expressway in Mumbai, India
 Highway 2 (Israel), also known as Coastal Road north of Tel Aviv
 Manila–Cavite Expressway, also known as Coastal Road, an expressway in the Philippines
 Coastal Road massacre, the 1978 hijacking of a bus on the Coastal Highway (Highway 2) in Israel